The 1974 West Virginia Mountaineers football team represented West Virginia University in the 1974 NCAA Division I football season. It was the Mountaineers' 82nd overall season and they competed as an independent. The team was led by head coach Bobby Bowden, in his fifth year, and played their home games at Mountaineer Field in Morgantown, West Virginia. They finished the season with a record of 4–7.

Schedule

Roster

References

West Virginia
West Virginia Mountaineers football seasons
West Virginia Mountaineers football